Huirangi Eruera Waikerepuru  (1 April 1929 – 8 April 2020) was a New Zealand Māori language activist and trade unionist of Taranaki and Ngāpuhi descent. He was active in the foundation and governance of Māori language radio and television.

Life and career 
Waikerepuru was a key figure in the creation of Ngā Kaiwhakapūmau i te Reo Māori (the Wellington Māori Language Board).
The board lodged a claim with the Waitangi Tribunal in 1984 to make Māori an official language of New Zealand. In 1986, the tribunal recommended that the language be acknowledged as a taonga (treasure) under Article II of the Treaty of Waitangi. This led to the claim being passed into law with the Māori Language Act 1987, which made Māori an official language, and set up Te Taura Whiri i Te Reo Māori (the Māori Language Commission).

The board went on to establish the Māori-language radio station Te Upoko o te Ika in 1988, which helped establish contemporary Māori broadcasting in New Zealand.

Waikerepuru had a 30-year relationship with the Tertiary Education Union and predecessors, which represents academic and general staff in universities and polytechnics.

Waikerepuru died in Palmerston North on 8 April 2020, aged 91.

Honours 
In 1995, Waikerepuru was awarded an Honorary Doctorate from the University of Waikato. In the 2014 Queen's Birthday Honours, he was appointed a Companion of the New Zealand Order of Merit, for services to Māori.

References

1929 births
2020 deaths
New Zealand academics
Māori language revivalists
Taranaki (iwi)
Ngāpuhi people
20th-century New Zealand educators
21st-century New Zealand educators
Companions of the New Zealand Order of Merit
People from New Plymouth